Uldolmok Tidal Power Station is a tidal power station in Uldolmok, Jindo County, South Korea. Additional 500 kW was commissioned in June 2011.

Part of the goal of generating 5,260 GWh through tidal power by 2020.

See also 

 List of power stations in South Korea
 List of largest power stations in the world

References 

Energy infrastructure completed in 2011
Tidal power stations in South Korea